Hyptis alata, the musky mint or clustered bushmint, is a shrub species of flowering plant in the Lamiaceae, the mint family. The genus Hyptis is commonly known as the bushmints. It is  a native species throughout the southeastern United States from Texas to North Carolina, as well as in Cuba, Argentina, southern Brazil, and Paraguay. It is found in wetlands, prairies, pond margins and wet flatwoods. Hyptis alata is the southeastern United States analog to the Southwestern deserts H. emoryi, the desert lavender.USDA: NRCS: Plants Profile Hyptis alata

Varieties
Hyptis alata subsp. alata - United States and  Cuba
Hyptis alata subsp. rugosula (Briq.) Harley - South America

References

alata
Flora of the Southeastern United States
Least concern plants
Flora of Cuba
Flora of South America
Freshwater plants
Plants described in 1817